Tritonus was a German progressive rock band active between 1972 and 1979. The band was initiated by Peter K. Seiler, a German art-student, based on Emerson, Lake and Palmer, complete with heavy keyboards and English vocals.

The first album Tritonus was a conventional symphonic rock recording, while the second one Between the Universe features more evolved synth arrangements and a new vocalist, Geff Harrison.

The group toured between 1973 and 1978, ending the next year.

Discography

Albums
1975: Tritonus (LP)
1976: Between The Universes (LP)
2015: Far in the Sky-Live at Stagge's Hotel 1977 (CD)

Singles & EPs
1973: The Way of Spending Time / Kite
1977: The Trojan Horse Race / Timewinds of Life

In compilations
 1976: Rock Offers
 1976: German Rock Scene Vol. II
 2008: Krautrock... and Beyond: Part 6
 2012: Krautrock: Music for Your Brain Vol. 5

Members
Keyboards: Peter K. Seiler
Vocals, bass:  Ronald Brand (1972-1977), Rolf-Dieter Schnapka (1977–79)
Guest vocals: Geff Harrison (1976)
Drums: Charlie Jöst (1972-1976), Bernhard Schuh (1976)

See also
 Carl August Tidemann, founder of the similarly named Norwegian band.

References

External links
 http://www.peterseiler.de/
 Babyblaue Prog-Reviews: Tritonus
 
 

Musical groups established in 1972
Symphonic rock groups
Krautrock musical groups
German progressive rock groups